Sabre Records was an America, Chicago-based independent record label, founded in 1953 by Art Sheridan.  It specialized in blues, jazz, and doo-wop.

Sabre closed down at the end of 1954, when its former owner became one of the financial backers of Vee-Jay, which was growing into a powerhouse of the independent record business.

History
Sabre was a subsidiary of Chance Records, a successful independent record label that Art Sheridan, who previously operated a record distributor and a pressing plant, opened in September 1950.

By 1953, Chance had built a roster of artists and was recording prolifically Sheridan was running both Chance Records and American Record Distributors out of an office at 1151 East 47th Street.  By June of that year, he needed a new outlet to accommodate his expanding catalog, so he opened Sabre at 1225 East 47th Street.

The first Sabre release appeared in July 1953.  It featured veteran blues performer Tampa Red, whose 19-year affiliation with RCA Victor was coming to an end, appearing under the pseudonym "Jimmy Eager." Backing was provided by what had become Sheridan's house band, directed by bassist Al Smith and featuring tenor saxophonist Red Holloway, guitarist Lefty Bates, and drummer Vernel Fournier.
Sabre also released a classic single by another member of Sheridan's blues roster, Willie Nix.

Although the more famous vocal groups, The Moonglows and The Flamingos, released their records on Chance, Sabre featured two doo-wop releases by the Five Blue Notes and three by the Five Echoes; one of the Echoes' singles included guest lead vocalist Walter Spriggs, going under the unconvincing stage name "Wally Wilson."  Backing for these sessions was provided by the bands of Ike "Fats" Cole and Al Smith.

Finally, Sabre recorded the jazz groups of Ben Bryant and Johnny Miller.

In June 1954, Al Smith and his corps of studio musicians moved to Vee-Jay.  Sabre made its last release in August 1954.  Sheridan wound down his labels in December 1954, becoming an unpublicized investor in the newer company.

Series 
Sabre was responsible for a total of nine releases (100 through 109, skipping 107).

Releases

See also
 List of record labels

References

External links 
The Chance and Sabre Labels

American record labels